Charles Stephens (born April 5, 1981) is a Canadian former professional ice hockey forward currently playing with the senior men's club, the Elora Rocks, who compete in the Western Ontario Super Hockey League (WOSHL).

Playing career
Stephens was highly rated as a young player and was selected first overall in the Ontario Hockey League entry draft, and attained national prominence for his role in the Esquire Swiss Watch company's advertising. He was selected in the second round of the 1999 NHL Entry Draft by the Washington Capitals, but did not sign with them and ultimately was re-drafted in 2001 by the Colorado Avalanche.

After a long OHL career with the Toronto St. Michael's Majors, Guelph Storm and London Knights, Stephens turned pro, but to date has only played 8 NHL games, all with Colorado. On January 23, 2004 Stephens was traded to the Ottawa Senators for Dennis Bonvie. However Stephens never played for the Senators spending most of his time with the Binghamton Senators.

For the season 2006–07 he signed a contract with the DEG Metro Stars of the Deutsche Eishockey Liga. In 2008, Stephens then signed for rivals the Krefeld Pinguine instantly becoming an integral part of the team.

After his third season with the Penguins, Stephens left as a free agent and signed a two-year contract to remain in Germany with Kölner Haie on April 12, 2011.

Career statistics

Regular season and playoffs

International

References

External links

1981 births
Living people
Binghamton Senators players
Canadian ice hockey centres
Colorado Avalanche draft picks
Colorado Avalanche players
DEG Metro Stars players
Guelph Storm players
Hershey Bears players
Sportspeople from London, Ontario
Kölner Haie players
Krefeld Pinguine players
London Knights players
Toronto St. Michael's Majors players
Washington Capitals draft picks
Ice hockey people from Ontario
Canadian expatriate ice hockey players in Germany